Milutin "Mima" Karadžić (born 9 April 1955) is a Montenegrin  actor, producer, and occasionally, a singer.

Though he had a few notable supporting roles in feature films, the majority of his acting work is tied to television.

Milutin Karadzic is a founder of MMPRODUCTION production house from Budva, Montenegro.

Filmography
Alexander of Yugoslavia (2021) TV Series .... Puniša Račić
Komšije (2015–2018) TV Series .... Mašan Čerović
Budva na pjenu od mora (2012)
Promeni me (2007)
Potera za Srećom (2005) .... Vukota
Sivi kamion crvene boje (2004) .... Sredoje
Volim te najviše na svetu (2003) .... Dragutin - Guta
Mješoviti brak (2003–2007) TV Series .... Vojin Čađenović
Ledina (2003) .... Blatobrk
Ko ćeka doćeka (2002) (TV)
Porodično blago 2 (2001) TV Series .... Govedarević
Sve je za ljude (2001) .... Orlović
U ime oca i sina (1999) .... Vukota
Džandrljivi muž (1998) (TV) .... Mita
Porodično blago (1998) TV Series .... Govedarević
Udri jače manijace (1995) .... Bane
Oridjinali (1995) (mini) TV Series .... Niša
Three Tickets to Hollywood (1993) .... Globus
Policajac sa Petlovog brda (1992)
Policajac sa Petlovog Brda (1992) (mini) TV Series
Prokleta je Amerika (1992) .... (segment "Kroz prasume Južne Amerike")
Prva bračna noć (1992) (TV)
Volim i ja nerandže... no trpim (1992) TV Series .... Stojan
Tesna koža 4 (1991) .... Blažo
Ljubav je hleb sa devet kora (1990) (TV)
Hajde da se volimo 3 (1990)
Bolji život (1990-1991) TV Series .... Danilo Zekavica
Ozaloscena porodica (1990) (TV) .... Trifun Spasić
Drugarica ministarka (1989) TV Series
Atoski vrtovi - preobrazenje (1989)
Boj na Kosovu (1989) .... Strazar
Kroz prasume Južne Amerike (1989) (TV) .... Milenče
Specijalna redakcija (1989) TV Series .... Radovan Mrak
Sveti Georgije ubiva aždahu (1989) (TV) .... Krivi Luka
Tajna manastirske rakije (1988) .... Petar
Hajde da se volimo (1987)
Oktoberfest (1987) .... Vojnik
Iznenadna i prerana smrt pukovnika K.K. (1987) (TV)
Milan - Dar (1987) (TV)
Slučaj Harms (1987) .... Invalid instruktor
Uvek spremne žene (1987) .... Ginekolog
Vuk Karadžić (1987) TV Series
Druga Zikina dinastija (1986) .... Komsija Paja
Lepota poroka (1986) .... Luka
Majstor i Šampita (1986) .... Bora, milicioner
Medved 007 (1986) (TV) .... Pešić
Odlazak ratnika, povratak maršala (1986) (mini) TV Series
Smešne i druge priće (1986) TV Series .... Anin muz
Šest dana juna (1985) .... Pilot
Debeli i mršavi (1985) .... Majstor
Nema problema (1984) .... Fudbaler sa šrafčigerom
Vojnici (1984) .... Božo Brajović-Njegoš
Davitelj protiv davitelja (1984) .... Mitrović
Maj nejm iz Mitar (1984) (TV) .... Obren
O pokojniku sve najlepše (1984) .... Orlović
Sivi do (1984) TV Series .... Miksa
Kako sam sistematski uništen od idiota (1983) .... Miličioner u Igalu
Trinaesti jul (1982) .... Narodni milicajac
Erogena zona (1981) .... Fudbaler
Poslednji cin (1981) TV Series
Slučaj Bogoljuba Šavkovića - Livca (1981) .... Bogoljub Šavković
Vojnici (1980) (mini) TV Series .... Božo Brajović-Njegoš
Sedam sekretara SKOJ-a (1978) (mini) TV Series

External links

1955 births
Living people
People from Bijelo Polje
Drobnjaci
Montenegrin male actors
20th-century Serbian male actors
Serbian male film actors
Actors from Nikšić
21st-century Montenegrin male actors
21st-century Serbian male actors
Serbian male television actors